Sir Erskine William Gladstone of Fasque and Balfour, 7th Baronet,  (29 October 1925 – 29 March 2018) was a teacher and an officer in the Royal Navy. The Scout Association appointed him as its Chief Scout from 1972 to 1982.

Gladstone was the son of Sir Charles Gladstone and Isla Margaret Gladstone (née Crum), and a great-grandson of the former prime minister, William Ewart Gladstone. He was educated at Eton, and joined the Royal Navy Volunteer Reserve in 1943 and saw action in World War II mainly based on destroyers in the Indian Ocean. Upon leaving the navy (with the rank of lieutenant), he received an honours degree in history at Christ Church, Oxford. He then entered the teaching profession, with positions at Shrewsbury and Eton, and he became head master of Lancing in 1961. He retired from the teaching profession in 1969.

Family
He married Rosamund Anne Hambro on 10 September 1962. They had three children.

Rosamund was daughter of Major Robert Alexander Hambro and Barbara Jessica Hardy Beaton.

Baronetcy
At the death of his father in 1968, he became the 7th Gladstone Baronet. He was made a Knight of the Garter in 1999. He held the office of Justice of the Peace (J.P.) for Flintshire in 1982. He held the office of Vice-Lord-Lieutenant of Clwyd between 1984 and 1985. He was Lord Lieutenant of Clwyd from 1985 to 2000.

Gladstone became a Scout whilst a student at Eton. He encouraged the Lancing school Scout Group whilst Head Master. The Scout Association appointed him as its Chief Scout from 1972 to 1982. During his tenure he took special interest in the development of Scouting in deprived areas, particularly the inner cities and new housing estates. In 1979, the World Organization of the Scout Movement's committee elected him as chairman.

Death
He died on 29 March 2018 at the age of 92
at his residence, Hawarden Castle, Hawarden, Flintshire, Wales.

References

|-

1925 births
2018 deaths
William Gladstone, 7th Baronet
Royal Navy officers of World War II
Royal Naval Volunteer Reserve personnel of World War II
Gladstone, William, 7th Baronet
Deputy Lieutenants of Flintshire
Head Masters of Lancing College
Knights of the Garter
Lord-Lieutenants of Clwyd
People educated at Eton College
People from Hawarden
Alumni of Christ Church, Oxford
Chief Scouts (The Scout Association)
World Scout Committee members
English people of Scottish descent
Welsh people of Scottish descent
Welsh people of English descent
Recipients of the Bronze Wolf Award
Welsh justices of the peace